Martin St Quinton is an entrepreneur involved in horse racing and Premier League Rugby. In 1980 he started an  office equipment company which was sold to Danka plc in 1993. He then founded Azzurri Communications, a UK based Voice & Data Integrator, which grew to 700 staff and £150 million turnover in 6 years. In 2006 Azzurri was sold for £180 million to The Prudential Group. He was named Ernst & Young Entrepreneur of the Year in 2003. He acquired a controlling interest in Gloucester Rugby in 2016 and became its Chairman. He is also a race horse owner and in 2019 was appointed Chairman of Cheltenham Racecourse.
Martin & Judith St Quinton are Trustees of The Fold, a Children's home in the Limpopo Province in South Africa.  The Fold is a place where young children in S Africa can find shelter, love and support.  The Fold has its own on site school where children can get a good basic education.
Since their appointment as Trustees in 2011 the St Quintons have been the sole UK fund raisers for The Fold which has grown from just 7 children in care in 2011 to over 40 children today.

Personal
St Quinton was born in Yorkshire. He graduated from Durham University in 1979.

References

Businesspeople from Yorkshire
Living people
Year of birth missing (living people)
Alumni of University College, Durham